Skip Barber Racing is a cancelled video game to be published and developed by Bethesda Softworks. The game was in development in conjunction with the Skip Barber Racing School.

Development
The game was announced in April 1999. It was originally scheduled to release in late 1999 and later in early 2000. The game's Lead Designer was Brent Erickson. Rumor's of the game's cancellation first surfaced in December 2000.

References

Cancelled Windows games
Bethesda Softworks games
Racing video games
Video games developed in the United States
Video games set in the United States
Windows games
Windows-only games